John Bailey (born 1901, date of death unknown) was a footballer who played as an inside forward for Southend United and Thames in the Football League.

References

1901 births
People from Grays, Essex
Southend United F.C. players
Thames A.F.C. players
English Football League players
Year of death missing
English footballers
Association football inside forwards